TrSS Immingham was a passenger and cargo vessel built for the Great Central Railway in 1906.

History

The ship was built by Swan Hunter of Wallsend and launched on 8 May 1906. She was one of an order for two ships, the other being .

The Parsons steam turbines of Immingham and Marylebone were direct-drive units that proved uneconomic, and both vessels were soon rebuilt as single-screw steamships with the funnels of each reduced in number from two to one.

She was requisitioned in 1915 by the Admiralty for Royal Navy use as a stores carrier and renamed HMS Immingham. She sank on 6 June 1915 after a collision with the boom defence vessel  in the Mediterranean Sea.

The Grimsby Fishing Heritage Centre has in its collection a painting by A.J. Jansen of Immingham as a single-screw steamer.

References

1906 ships
Steamships of the United Kingdom
Ships built on the River Tyne
Ships of the Great Central Railway
World War I auxiliary ships of the United Kingdom
Maritime incidents in 1915
Ships sunk in collisions
World War I shipwrecks in the Mediterranean Sea